Paradrillia nannodes is a species of sea snail, a marine gastropod mollusk in the family Horaiclavidae.

Description

Distribution
This marine species occurs in the Red Sea

References

 Sturany R (1900) Diagnosen neuer Gastropoden aus dem Rothen Meere als Vorläufer einer Bearbeitung der gesammten von S. M. Schiff "Pola" gefundenen Gastropoden (Fortsetzung). Anzeiger der Kaiserlichen Akademie der Wissenschaften, Mathematisch-Naturwissenschaftliche Classe 18: 208–212.

External links
  Tucker, J.K. 2004 Catalog of recent and fossil turrids (Mollusca: Gastropoda). Zootaxa 682:1–1295.
 Janssen R, Taviani M (2015) Taxonomic, ecological and historical considerations on the deep-water benthic mollusc fauna of the Red Sea. In: Rasul NMA, Stewart ICF (Eds) The Red Sea. Springer, Berlin & Heidelberg, 511–529
 Albano, Paolo G., et al. "An illustrated catalogue of Rudolf Sturany’s type specimens in the Naturhistorisches Museum Wien, Austria (NHMW): Red Sea gastropods." Zoosystematics and Evolution 93 (2017): 45. 
 Dekker, H.; Orlin, Z. (2000). Check-list of Red Sea Mollusca. Spirula. 47 (supplement): 1–46

nannodes
Gastropods described in 1900